|}

The Prix de Meautry is a Group 3 flat horse race in France open to thoroughbreds aged three years or older. It is run at Deauville over a distance of 1,200 metres (about 6 furlongs), and it is scheduled to take place each year in August.

History
The event is named after Haras de Meautry, a successful stud farm located near Deauville. It was established in 1877, and was initially contested over 900 metres. It was extended to 1,000 metres in 1887.

The race was abandoned throughout World War I, with no running from 1914 to 1918. A new distance of 1,200 metres was introduced in 1922.

Deauville Racecourse was closed during World War II, and the Prix de Meautry was cancelled in 1940. For the remainder of this period it was switched between Maisons-Laffitte (1941–43, 1945) and Longchamp (1944). The Longchamp edition was run over a length of 1,300 metres.

Records
Most successful horse (4 wins):
 Cricket Ball – 1986, 1987, 1988, 1989

Leading jockey (10 wins):
 Roger Poincelet – Fine Art (1946), Djama (1947), Damnos (1948), Abis (1949), Djebe (1950), Sanguine (1951), Bibi Toori (1952), Anne d'Anjou (1958), L'Epinay (1961), First Date (1967)

Leading trainer (5 wins):
 James C. Watson – Ferrieres (1897), Girasol (1903), Volte Face (1905), Syphon (1906, 1907)

Leading owner (4 wins):
 Daniel Wildenstein – Mismaloya (1969), El Rastro (1973), Pole Position (1990), Monde Bleu (1993)
 Robin Scully – Cricket Ball (1986, 1987, 1988, 1989)

Winners since 1980

Earlier winners

 1877: Pensacola
 1878: Porcelaine
 1879: Telegramme
 1880: Sorbe
 1881: Bienveillante
 1882: Comte Alfred
 1883: Conquerant
 1884: Conquerant
 1885: Bonbon
 1886: Prudence
 1887: Frapotel
 1888:
 1889: Lugano
 1890: War Dance
 1891: Reveille
 1892: C'est Sa Soeur
 1893: Hoche
 1894: Arnica
 1895: Beatrix
 1896: Sheridan
 1897: Ferrieres
 1898: Railleur
 1899: Railleur
 1900: Listo
 1901:
 1902: Alatri
 1903: Girasol
 1904:
 1905: Volte Face
 1906: Syphon
 1907: Syphon
 1908: Gourbi
 1909: Syphon
 1910: Lorlette
 1911: Jarretiere
 1912: Jarretiere
 1913: Pantagruel
 1914–18: no race
 1919: Assyrienne
 1920: Glorious
 1921: Dolphin
 1922: Zapanie
 1923: Niceas
 1924: Sainte Hermine
 1925: Millet
 1926: Pacific
 1927: Madeline
 1928: Panuco
 1929: Sediranda
 1930: Slipper
 1931: Alluvial
 1932: Cake Walk
 1933: Mlle d'Argagnan
 1934: Makila
 1935: Hajiri
 1936: Limac
 1937: Mandoline
 1938: Miraculeux
 1939: Antineus
 1940: no race
 1941: Boga
 1942: Branka
 1943: Dogat
 1944: Fanatique
 1945: Vagabond
 1946: Fine Art
 1947: Djama
 1948: Damnos
 1949: Abis
 1950: Djebe
 1951: Sanguine
 1952: Bibi Toori
 1953: Alypat
 1954: Vamarie
 1955:
 1956: Verrieres
 1957: Midget
 1958: Anne d'Anjou
 1959: Edellic
 1960: Tanata
 1961: L'Épinay
 1962: Fortino
 1963: Ligonier
 1964: Takawalk
 1965: Takawalk
 1966:
 1967: First Date
 1968:
 1969: Mismaloya
 1970: Balidar
 1971: No Mercy
 1972: Some Hand
 1973: El Rastro
 1974: Flirting Around
 1975: Street Light
 1976: Girl Friend
 1977: Girl Friend
 1978: King of Macedon
 1979: King of Macedon

See also
 List of French flat horse races

References

 France Galop / Racing Post:
 , 

 france-galop.com – A Brief History: Prix de Meautry.
 galop.courses-france.com – Prix de Meautry – Palmarès depuis 1983.
 galopp-sieger.de – Prix de Meautry.
 horseracingintfed.com – International Federation of Horseracing Authorities – Prix de Meautry (2018).
 pedigreequery.com – Prix de Meautry – Deauville.

Open sprint category horse races
Deauville-La Touques Racecourse
Horse races in France
Recurring sporting events established in 1877
1877 establishments in France